is a Japanese professional golfer. She has won six times on the LPGA Tour and six times on the LPGA of Japan Tour.

Amateur career
Hataoka was born on 13 January 1999, named after the United States space program, NASA. As an amateur, she won the 2016 Japan Women's Open Golf Championship, a major tournament on the LPGA of Japan Tour. She was the youngest player and first amateur to win a JLPGA major. She turned professional after her victory and competed in the LPGA Final Qualifying Tournament. She finished 14th to earn her LPGA Tour card for 2017.

Professional career

2017
In 2017, Hataoka played on both the LPGA Tour and LPGA of Japan Tour. On the LPGA Tour, she made 9 cuts in 17 events and finished 140th on the money list, losing her card. On the LPGA of Japan Tour, she won two events, including a second Japan Women's Open, and finished 14th on the money list. She again competed in the LPGA Final Qualifying Tournament, finishing first to re-earn her LPGA Tour card for 2018.

2018
Playing almost exclusively on the LPGA Tour in 2018, Hataoka won two events, the Walmart NW Arkansas Championship and the Toto Japan Classic, which was co-sanctioned with the JLPGA. Her Toto Japan Classic win took her into the top 10 of the Women's World Golf Rankings. At the 2018 KPMG Women's PGA Championship, Hataoka lost in a playoff to Park Sung-hyun. She also finished tied for 10th at the 2018 U.S. Women's Open. She finished the season 5th on the money list and 3rd on the Race to the CME Globe.

2019
On 31 March 2019, Hataoka won the Kia Classic at Aviara, closing with a 5-under-par 67 to clinch a three-stroke victory.

2021
In June 2021, Hataoka started the final round of the U.S. Women's Open in sixth place. She shot a final round 67 at The Olympic Club and got into a playoff with Yuka Saso. Saso won with a birdie on the third playoff hole.

Hataoka won her fourth LPGA Tour title, the Marathon Classic by six strokes, after 54 holes, because poor weather conditions made the course unplayable on Sunday, 11 July.

Hataoka won her fifth LPGA title, and the second time (2018) in the Walmart NW Arkansas Championship, at Rogers, Arkansas on 26 September, by a stroke, after 54 holes. Minjee Lee and Ji Eun-hee were tied for second place. She set the scoring record in the 2018 event. She is ranked third for a Japanese golfer in wins. With her $345,000 win, she rose to second place in the money ranking, trailing only number 1 world-ranked Nelly Korda.

2022
In 2022, she won the DIO Implant LA Open on 24 April, her sixth win on the LPGA Tour, and the $225,000 prize. Her world ranking jumped six places, from 12 to 6, which is where she ranked at the end of 2021. She had missed the cut in her previous tournament the week before at the Lotte Championship, but won by five strokes over Hannah Green. She had a six-stroke lead after the 17th hole with a chance to tie the tournament record at 268, but bogeying the 18th made it a 269. With a four-stroke lead going into the final round, her new ball position and swing change that weekend from a new coach, helped her miss only four fairways and seven greens.

Amateur wins
2015 IMG Academy Junior World Championship, Kanto Junior Championship, Faldo Series Asia Japan Championship
2016 Faldo Series Asia Grand Final, Kanto Amateur Championship, Ciputra World Junior Championship, IMG Academy Junior World Championship

Source:

Professional wins (11)

LPGA Tour wins (6)

Co-sanctioned by the LPGA of Japan Tour.
Reduced to 54 holes due to weather.

LPGA Tour playoff record (0–4)

LPGA of Japan Tour wins (6)

Hataoka won the 2016 Japan Women's Open Golf Championship as an amateur.
Co-sanctioned by the LPGA Tour.
Tournaments in bold denotes major tournaments in LPGA of Japan Tour.

Results in LPGA majors
Results not in chronological order before 2019 or in 2020

CUT = missed the half-way cut
NT = no tournament
T = tied

LPGA Tour career summary

 official as of 2022 season
*Includes matchplay and other tournaments without a cut.

World ranking
Position in Women's World Golf Rankings at the end of each calendar year.

^ as of 27 February 2023

Team appearances
Amateur
Espirito Santo Trophy (representing Japan): 2016
Patsy Hankins Trophy (representing Asia/Pacific): 2016 (winners)

Professional
International Crown (representing Japan): 2018
Amata Friendship Cup (representing Japan): 2018

References

External links

Japanese female golfers
LPGA of Japan Tour golfers
LPGA Tour golfers
Olympic golfers of Japan
Golfers at the 2020 Summer Olympics
Sportspeople from Ibaraki Prefecture
1999 births
Living people
21st-century Japanese women